Steve is a 2010 British drama short film written and directed by Rupert Friend and starring Colin Firth, Keira Knightley and Tom Mison. It screened at the 2010 BFI London Film Festival.

The film was released theatrically as a section of the compilation film Stars in Shorts in 2012.

Premise
A young couple receive visits from their downstairs neighbor that become increasingly frequent and unpredictable. That neighbor's name is Steve.

Cast
Colin Firth as Steve
Keira Knightley as Woman
Tom Mison as Man

References

External links

2010 films
2010 short films
British short films
2010s English-language films